Honeymoon is a 1947 comedy film directed by William Keighley, starring Shirley Temple, Guy Madison and Franchot Tone.

Plot
Barbara (Shirley Temple), the sweetheart of a GI corporal, and Phil (Guy Madison), elope to Mexico City. Barbara discovers that her boyfriend, stationed in the Panama Canal Zone, not only has his flight been delayed but the two become trapped in bureaucratic red tape, including the need for a doctor's certificate, and may not have their wedding before he has to return to his military base.  The US Embassy Vice Consul (Franchot Tone) goes to great lengths to intervene and help the young lovers, but frequent misunderstandings jeopardise his own upcoming marriage, including when Barbara's diving accident in a pool makes her want to pursue him instead.

Production
RKO originally planned to obtain the three stars of Since You Went Away from David O. Selznick, however Joseph Cotten refused the role played in the film by Franchot Tone.  Production in 1945 Mexico City was delayed by a strike.

The film was William Keighley's first film after his World War II service with the First Motion Picture Unit and after he finished his tenure at Warner Bros.

Cast
 Shirley Temple as Barbara Olmstead
 Franchot Tone as David Flanner
 Guy Madison as Corporal Phil Vaughn
 Lina Romay as Raquel Mendoza
 Gene Lockhart as Consul Prescott
 Corinna Mura as Senora Mendoza
 Grant Mitchell as Congressman Crenshaw
 Julio Villarreal as Senor Gaspar Mendoza
 Manuel Arvide as Registrar
 José Goula as Dr. Diego (as Jose R. Goula)

Reception
According to Variety, the film earned less than $1 million at the box office.

The film recorded a loss of $675,000.

References

External links
 
 
 
 
 

1947 films
American romantic comedy films
1947 romantic comedy films
1940s English-language films
Films directed by William Keighley
Films set in Mexico
Films scored by Leigh Harline
American black-and-white films
1940s American films